Barton is a census-designated place (CDP) in Bernalillo and Santa Fe counties, New Mexico, United States. It was first listed as a CDP prior to the 2020 census.

Barton is in eastern Bernalillo County and the southwest corner of Santa Fe County. It is bordered to the east by the town of Edgewood and to the northwest by Sedillo. Interstate 40 forms the northern border of the community, leading west  to Albuquerque and east  to Santa Rosa. New Mexico State Road 217 crosses Barton from its start at I-40 and leads south  to State Road 222 near Manzano Springs.

Demographics

Education
All parts of Barton, in both counties, are zoned to Moriarty Municipal Schools.

References 

Census-designated places in Bernalillo County, New Mexico
Census-designated places in Santa Fe County, New Mexico
Census-designated places in New Mexico